The men's K-1 1000 metres competition at the 2019 ICF Canoe Sprint World Championships in Szeged took place at the Olympic Centre of Szeged.

Schedule
The schedule was as follows:

All times are Central European Summer Time (UTC+2)

Results

Heats
The four fastest boats in each heat, plus the three fastest fifth-place boats advanced to the semifinals.

Heat 1

Heat 2

Heat 3

Heat 4

Heat 5

Heat 6

Semifinals
Qualification in each semi was as follows:

The fastest three boats advanced to the A final.
The next three fastest boats advanced to the B final.
The seventh, eighth and ninth-place boats advanced to the C final.

Semifinal 1

Semifinal 2

Semifinal 3

Finals

Final C
Competitors in this final raced for positions 19 to 27.

Final B
Competitors in this final raced for positions 10 to 18.

Final A
Competitors in this final raced for positions 1 to 9, with medals going to the top three.

References

ICF